Effenbergerite is the natural occurrence of the color Han blue.It was first found in the Wessels mine, Kalahari Manganese Field, South Africa.
Effenbergerite was approved as a valid mineral species by the IMA in 1993.

Effenberergite has the chemical formula .

The mineral was named after Dr. Herta S. Effenberger, a mineralogist and crystallographer at the University of Vienna.

References

External links 

 https://rruff.info/Effenbergerite
 http://database.iem.ac.ru/mincryst/s_carta.php?EFFENBERGERITE
 https://www.google.com/search?q=Effenbergerite&tbm=isch
 http://rruff.geo.arizona.edu/AMS/result.php?mineral=Effenbergerite
 https://mineralogy-ima.org/

Barium minerals
Copper minerals
Tetragonal minerals